The Art of Grammar ( - or romanized, Téchnē Grammatikḗ) is a treatise on Greek grammar, attributed to Dionysius Thrax, who wrote in the 2nd century BC.

Contents
It is the first work on grammar in Greek, and also the first concerning a Western language.

It sought mainly to help speakers of Koine Greek understand the language of Homer, and other great poets of the past.

It has become a source for how ancient texts should be acted out based on the experience from commonly read ancient authors.

There are six parts to understanding grammar including trained reading by understanding the dialect from certain poetical figures.

There is a nine-part word classification system, which strayed away from the previous eight-part classification system.

It describes morphological structure as containing no middle diathesis.

There is no morphological analysis and the text uses the Word and Paradigm model.

Translation
It was translated into Syriac by Joseph Huzaya of the school of Nisibis in the 6th century.

It was also translated into Armenian.

References

External links
 
 
 Art of Grammar in Greek on Bibliotheca Augustana
 The Grammar of Dionysios Thrax, translation by Thomas Davidson
 The Grammar of Dionysius Thrax, translation by Anthony Alcock

Grammar books
History of linguistics
Greek grammar